Raw Sienna is the fifth album by the band Savoy Brown.

It was recorded and released by Decca in the UK 1970 in both mono and stereo (LK/SKL 5043). For release in USA and Canada, masters were leased to Parrot Records (London Records)—PAS 71036.

AllMusic noted that

Track listing

Side one
 "A Hard Way to Go" (Chris Youlden) – 2:17
 "That Same Feelin'" (Kim Simmonds) – 3:36
 "Master Hare" (Simmonds) – 4:45
 "Needle and Spoon" (Youlden) – 3:18
 "A Little More Wine" (Youlden) – 4:51

Side two
 "I'm Crying" (Youlden) – 4:17
 "Stay While the Night Is Young" (Youlden) – 3:07
 "Is That So" (Simmonds) – 7:40
 "When I Was a Young Boy" (Youlden) – 3:02

Personnel

Savoy Brown
 Chris Youlden – vocals; piano on tracks 4, 6, 9
 Kim Simmonds – lead guitar; piano on tracks 2, 3
 "Lonesome" Dave Peverett – rhythm guitar, acoustic guitar; bottleneck guitar on track 5
 Tone Stevens – bass
 Roger Earl – drums, percussion

Technical
 Kim Simmonds, Chris Youlden – producers, arrangements
 Terry Noonan – brass and string arrangements
 Paul Tregurtha – engineer
 Malcolm Addey – mixing engineer
 Ignatz – artwork

Charts

Album

References

External links
Savoy Brown's Homepage

1970 albums
Savoy Brown albums
Decca Records albums
Albums produced by Kim Simmonds